Bunim/Murray Productions is an entertainment production company based out of Glendale, California, and is considered a pioneer in the reality television genre. It is best known for The Real World, Road Rules and Bad Girls Club.  Mary-Ellis Bunim and Jonathan Murray co-founded Bunim/Murray after agent Mark Itkin of the William Morris Agency put the two together to develop a scripted soap opera for MTV. When that was too expensive, they decided to try an unscripted soap and The Real World was born. "We knew within 20 minutes of shooting that we had a show," Bunim said. The company has expanded into music management, managing the pop punk/emo band A Cursive Memory. In March 2010, the company was acquired by Banijay Entertainment (former name of Banijay Group).

The company's initial success was on the creation of The Real World. Attempts at scripted series, including Jam Bay, a show that would have co-produced with Universal Television for ABC, never went past the pilot stage. On June 28, 1999, the company attempted to enter into the syndication business, by planning on to partner with Columbia TriStar Television Distribution to launch a reality strip Love Hurts. In 2001, Bunim/Murray partnered with Artists Television Group, on the unaired WB television show Lost in the USA, but it was cancelled and it was hit with a $1 million lawsuit. On December 16, 2002, the company announced that they would partner with film studio New Line Cinema on the company's only theatrical project, The Real Cancun.

Current television shows 

After Happily Ever After
Ball in the Family
Born For Business
The Challenge
The Challenge: All Stars
 The Challenge Argentina: El Desafío
The Challenge: Australia
The Challenge UK
The Challenge: USA
The Challenge: World Championship
Collab Crib
Don't Forget the Lyrics!
El Mundo Real
Emily's Wonder Lab
Endless Summer
Family or Fiance
For Real: The Story of Reality TV
Growing up is a Drag
House of Creators
Iyanla: Fix My Life
Miz & Mrs.
On Edge
Project Runway
Project Runway All Stars
The Real World
The Real World Homecoming
Road Trippin
Stranded with Sam and Colby
Sway Life
Twinning Out
Valerie's Home Cooking

Past television shows 

#SOS stylist on setAllure IncubatorAmerican FamiliesAmerica's Psychic ChallengeBad Girls ClubBad Girls All-Star BattleBad Girls Road TripBest InkBorn This WayBorn to DivaBRKDWNChachi's WorldThe Challenge: Champs vs. StarsCitizen RoseThe Crystal MazeDash DollsDeaf Out LoudDisney TRYathlonDr. Steve-OEarth LiveThe Gary Owen ShowGirl Next DoorGloBugz!Happy WheelsThe HealerHoward SternI Am CaitKeeping Up with the KardashiansKhloé & LamarKourtney and Kim Take MiamiKourtney and Kim Take New YorkKourtney and Khloé Take The HamptonsL'Oreal Paris AcademyLife of a Fitness Pop StarLife of KylieLindsay Lohan's Beach ClubLiving LohanLookbookLove CruiseLove Games: Bad Girls Need Love TooLove Thy SisterMaking the BandMariah's WorldMarried to RockModels of the RunwayMotor City MastersMrs. Eastwood & CompanyMurderOld Skool with Terry and GitaOne Ocean ViewThe Rebel BillionaireReunited: The Real World Las VegasRoad RulesRob & ChynaSaddle RanchThe Scholar The SelectionThe Simple LifeSki PatrolSo CosmoThe Spin CrowdStarting OverStewarts & HamiltonsStyl'dSupreme Court of ComedySurviving R. KellyTotal BellasTotal DivasUnder the GunnUndressedWildlife Rescue RangersWWE Legends' House Films and documentaries Autism: The MusicalCamp Steve-OKim Kardashian West: The Justice ProjectPedroPersonally YoursThe Real CancunThe Real World Movie: The Lost SeasonThe Real World Presents: Return to DutyShadow BillionaireThey Call Us MonstersTranshoodValentine RoadWealth HuntersSexual assault controversy
In October 2011, two years after Real World/Road Rules Challenge: The Ruins aired, contestant Tonya Cooley filed a lawsuit against fellow contestants Kenny Santucci and Evan Starkman, MTV, and Bunim/Murray Productions, claiming that she was sexually assaulted during filming. Cooley claimed in the lawsuit that Santucci and Starkman inserted a toothbrush into her vaginal canal while she was passed out from heavy drinking, and stated that she was subjected to an environment in which degrading and harassing behavior was directed at female contestants, including bathing suits stripped off their bodies.  A representative for Bunim/Murray said that "after a thorough investigation, we have found Tonya Cooley’s claims to be completely baseless." Cooley also alleged that the show's producers encouraged and rewarded such behavior, and that when she raised concerns she was told to "just deal with it." A representative for Viacom blamed Cooley for the alleged assault against her, stating in court that "in addition to failing to avail herself of VMN's policies and complaint procedures, Plaintiff failed to avoid the injuries of which she complains. For example, while she was a contestant on The Ruins'', Plaintiff was frequently intoxicated (to an extent far greater than other contestants), rowdy, combative, flirtatious and on multiple occasions intentionally exposed her bare breasts and genitalia to other contestants." The lawsuit was settled out of court one year later.

References

External links 
 Official website
 

Television production companies of the United States
Companies based in Los Angeles
Banijay
American subsidiaries of foreign companies
American companies established in 1987
Mass media companies established in 1987
2010 mergers and acquisitions